Przemysław Reut (born 1969) is a Polish filmmaker based in New York City.  He won the Someone to Watch Award at the 18th Independent Spirit Awards for his work in the film Paradox Lake (2002).

Reut studied journalism at the University of Warsaw and film at the School of Visual Arts.

Filmography
Close Up (1996)
Paradox Lake (2002)

References

External links
 

Living people
1969 births
Polish film directors
Independent Spirit Award winners
University of Warsaw alumni
School of Visual Arts alumni
Polish expatriates in the United States